This is a list of pro-European political parties in Europe, both active and defunct.

By country

Albania

Armenia

Austria

Azerbaijan

Belarus

Belgium

Bosnia and Herzegovina

Bulgaria

Croatia

Cyprus

Czech Republic

Denmark

Estonia

Finland

France

Georgia

Germany

Greece

Hungary

Iceland

Ireland

Italy

Kazakhstan

Kosovo

Latvia

Lithuania

Luxembourg

Malta

Moldova

Montenegro

Netherlands

North Macedonia

Norway

Poland

Portugal

Romania

Russia

San Marino

Serbia

Slovakia

Slovenia

Spain

Sweden

Switzerland

Turkey

Ukraine

United Kingdom

Yugoslavia

See also 
 List of Eurosceptic political parties

References 

 
Pro-European